Michel Clarque is a New Caledonian professional football manager. He plays as a goalkeeper for the New Caledonia national football team. In 2002, he coached the New Caledonia national football team. Currently he is a coach of the Hienghène Sport.

Honours
New Caledonia Cup: 1
 2013

References

Year of birth missing (living people)
Living people
New Caledonian footballers
New Caledonia international footballers
New Caledonian football managers
New Caledonia national football team managers
Place of birth missing (living people)
Association football goalkeepers